Suihua is a prefecture-level city in west-central Heilongjiang province, People's Republic of China, adjacent to Yichun to the east, Harbin, the provincial capital, to the south, Daqing to the west and Heihe to the north. It has 3,756,167 inhabitants at the 2020 census, of whom 698,025 lived in the built-up (or metro) area made of Beilin District.

Geography
Suihua is located in the northern part of the Songnen Plain (Songhuajiang-Nenjiang Plain), and situated in the central part of Heilongjiang Province. Bordering prefectures are:
Daqing (W)
Harbin (S)
Heihe (N)
Qiqihar (NW)
Yichun (E)

Transportation
The railway station of Suihua is located at the crossing of Taiping Road and Beilin Road in the eastern region of the city proper. The Harbin-Jiamusi Railway and the Harbin-Heihe Railway connect the city with Harbin, Jiamusi and several other cities in Heilongjiang Province. There are also buses to Daqing, Qiqihar and other cities in Heilongjiang.

Climate
Suihua has a humid continental climate (Köppen Dwa), with long, bitterly cold, but dry winters, and humid, very warm summers. A majority of the annual precipitation occurs in July and August alone.

History
Suihua's history can be stretched back to over 10,000 years ago. Paleolithic Age stone tools were unearthed at Hailun and Zhaodong. Neolithic sites belong to the Ang'angxi Culture type were also discovered at Anda. Sushen, the ancestors of the Manchu, inhabited in this region During the Xia Dynasty and Shang Dynasty. During the Yuan Dynasty, agriculture developed rapidly in Suihua.

Qing dynasty
From 1653, Suihua area was under the rule of Ningguta General. In 1683, the position of Heilongjiang General was established, Suihua was under the rule of Heilongjiang General. On November 20, 1885, the Directly Ruled Ting of Suihua was established at Beilin Tuanzi, a barren at that time. In 1905 it was redesigned as Suihua Fu.

Republic of China (1912–49)
In 1912, an army regiment was established in Suihua. The outbreak of plague caused 1683 deaths that year. In February 1913, 3000 brigands attacked the county seat, and was flattened by the garrison corps. In August 1917, in Suihua established the first telephone company. In July 1919, the 2nd High School of Heilongjiang Province was created. In February 1929, the county government was formally established.

In April 1932, the Japanese entered the city, resistance army led by Ma Zhanshan withdrew. The Manchuko county government was created on July 12, 1933. In December 1934, Suihua county was put under the administration of Binjiang Province. In 1939, the county was incorporated into Bei'an Province, and the county hospital was built. On July 28, 1941, Counter-Japanese United Army organized the National Salvation Society at Shuanghe, Wuying villages. The Manchu government ordered the peasants to supply military grain, and often faced heavy resistance. In 1943 the Suihua-Jiamusi railway was opened to traffic. The Soviets took the city on August 27, 1945, and Chen Lei was made the first County CPC secretary in November.

The land reform movement began in 1947. Many Suihua people joined the Chinese civil war, especially the Siping Campaign. On May 13, 1949, Suihua County Government was renamed Suihua People's Government.

People's Republic of China (1949–present)
Suihua is approved to become a prefecture-level city in 1999, and officially designated a prefecture-level city on June 14, 2000.

Administrative divisions

Economy

As an agricultural production hub in Heilongjiang province, Suihua's GDP has reached RMB 73.34 billion in 2010, an increase of 14.8 percent over the previous year. To the city's GDP, the main contributors are the agricultural sector and service sector. Petrochemicals, textiles and machinery are some other pillar industries in Suihua. In 2015, Suihua had a GDP of RMB 127.22 billion.

References

External links
Suihua Official Website 

 
Cities in Heilongjiang
Prefecture-level divisions of Heilongjiang